Al-Ahli Sports Club also known as Al-Ahli Wad Medani is a football club in Wad Medani, Sudan. They played in the top level of Sudanese professional football, the Sudan Premier League. Their rival is Ittihad Madani,  a team also based in Wad Medani
Al-Ahli (Wad Medani)
Founded in 1928

Honours

National titles
Sudan Premier League
Runners-up (2):1969, 1982
Sudan Cup
Runners-up (1) :2000

Performance in CAF Competitions
African Cup Winners' Cup
1983 – Second Round

References

External links
Team profile – leballonrond.fr

Football clubs in Sudan
Al Jazirah (state)
1928 establishments in Sudan
Association football clubs established in 1928